Perth Glory Football Club is an Australian professional soccer club based in Perth, Western Australia. The club played its first competitive match in October 1996, in the first round of the 1996–97 National Soccer League. They have played at their current home ground, Perth Oval, since their foundation in 1995. Perth is one of the three A-League clubs to survive the demise of the National Soccer League, the previous top division in Australian soccer. The club was implemented into the inaugural A-League season in 2005, and has since participated in every A-League Men season.

Since the inception of the club in 1995, Perth have had 13 different managers (including one caretaker manager). The current manager is Ruben Zadkovich, who took over from Richard Garcia on 20 March 2022. Glory's most successful manager is Mich d'Avray, who won two premierships and two championships during his three season tenure.

Managers

 Manager dates and nationalities are sourced from WorldFootball.net. Statistics are sourced from OzFootball and A-League Stats. Names of caretaker managers are supplied where known, and periods of caretaker management are highlighted in italics and marked caretaker or caretaker, then permanent appointment, depending on the scenario. Win percentage is rounded to two decimal places.
 Only first-team competitive matches are counted. Wins, losses and draws are results at the final whistle; the results of penalty shoot-outs are not counted.
 Statistics are complete up to and including the match played on 5 November 2022.

Key
M = matches played; W = matches won; D = matches drawn; L = matches lost; GF = Goals for; GA = Goals against; Win % = percentage of total matches won
  Managers with this background and symbol in the "Name" column are italicised to denote caretaker appointments.
  Managers with this background and symbol in the "Name" column are italicised to denote caretaker appointments promoted to full-time manager.

References

External links

 
Melbourne City|Perth Glory